Yeocheon City, also called as Yeocheon-si, or shortly Yeocheon, was a former si (city) in South Jeolla Province (Jeollanam-do), South Korea. The city was located in central part of the Yeosu Peninsula, south-eastern part of South Jeolla Province. It was established on 1 January 1986, was split from Yeocheon County (Yeocheon-gun), and it was dissolved on 1 April 1998, was merged to Yeosu City (Yeosu-si). It had seven (7) haengjeongdong, and maybe twenty four (24) beopjeongdong. The former Yeocheon city hall was in Ssangbong-dong by haengjeongdong, Hak-dong by beopjeongdong. It is used to the Yeosu city hall since 1 April 1998.

Administrative divisions (dong) 
It had seven haengjeongdong: Myodo-dong, Samil-dong, Sangam-dong, Sijeon-dong, Ssangbong-dong, Yeocheon-dong and Jusam-dong, and maybe twenty four beopjeongdong.

Yeosu
Cities in South Jeolla Province